KOWZ (100.9 FM) is a radio station licensed to Blooming Prairie, Minnesota and serving the Owatonna-Waseca/Minneapolis-St. Paul area. KOWZ carries a full service adult contemporary format.

KOWZ (pronounced as "cows") is owned by Linder Radio Group, which owns radio stations in Owatonna, Mankato, St. James, and Marshall

External links
KOWZ official website

Radio stations in Minnesota
Mainstream adult contemporary radio stations in the United States
Radio stations established in 1996
1996 establishments in Minnesota